Bickley is a suburb located within the City of Kalamunda, in Perth, Western Australia.

It is situated on the Darling Scarp and is known for the brook of the same name.

Before 1949 it was a stopping place on the Upper Darling Range Railway. It was originally known as "Heidelburg" or "Heidelberg", but during World War I, Western Australian Government Railways and Tramways renamed it "Bickley" after a local pioneer Wallace Bickley.

It has been the site of holiday and other sorts of camps.

The Seven Network and Australian Broadcasting Corporation's Perth television transmission towers have been located there since the founding of television in Perth in 1959.

Perth Observatory, originally situated in West Perth is also currently located in Bickley.

It is also one of the major meteorological stations within the Perth Metropolitan Area due to its length of time of operation and location on the Darling Scarp.

It is also the location of water reservoirs.

Climate 

Bickley has a Mediterranean climate (Köppen climate classification Csa), like the rest of Perth. Bickley has one of the highest average annual rainfalls for the Perth metropolitan region, and it experiences cooler nights than the rest of Perth, meaning that Bickley has a microclimate.

See also
 Australian place names changed from German names

References

External links

 
Suburbs in the City of Kalamunda